Kindi is a town in the Kindi Department of Boulkiemdé Province in central western Burkina Faso. It is the capital of Kindi Department and has a population of 32,207.

References

External links
Satellite map at Maplandia.com

Populated places in Boulkiemdé Province